The 2011–12 season will be Airdrie United's second consecutive season in the Scottish Second Division, having been relegated from the Scottish First Division at the end of the 2009–10 season. They will also compete in the Challenge Cup, League Cup and the Scottish Cup.

Summary
Airdrie finished fourth in the Second Division, entering the play-offs losing 6–2 to Dumbarton on aggregate in the final and remained in the Second Division. They reached the first round of the Challenge Cup, the third round of the League Cup and the fourth round of the Scottish Cup.

League table

Results and fixtures

Second Division

First Division play-offs

Scottish Cup

Challenge Cup

League Cup

Player statistics

Squad 
Last updated 26 May 2012 

 

|}
a.  Includes other competitive competitions, including the play-offs and the 2011–12 Scottish Challenge Cup.

Disciplinary record

Includes all competitive matches.
Last updated 26 May 2012

Awards

Last updated 26 May 2012

Transfers

Players in

Players out

References

Airdrieonians F.C. seasons
Airdrie United